Faegre & Benson LLP is a predecessor to the firm Faegre Baker Daniels LLP, which resulted after the firm merged in 2012 with Indianapolis-based Baker & Daniels LLP.  Even prior to the merger, Faegre & Benson was the largest law firm in Minnesota (ahead of Dorsey & Whitney, its key competitor in the Twin Cities, by number of lawyers) and one of the 100 largest firms headquartered in the United States, with more than 500 lawyers on three continents. Faegre & Benson was established in Minneapolis in 1886 as Cobb & Wheelwright. As a full-service law firm, Faegre & Benson provided legal counseling and litigation to clients in a wide range of practice areas. On August 11, 2011, Faegre announced that it was in discussions with Baker & Daniels regarding a potential merger. The merger was completed January 1, 2012.

References

External links
Faegre & Benson LLP: The Law Firm
Chambers and Partners Profile
Martindale-Hubbell profile

Law firms established in 1886
Law firms based in Minneapolis
Defunct law firms of the United States
1886 establishments in Minnesota
2012 disestablishments in Minnesota
Law firms disestablished in 2012